Morrill Peak is a sharp-pointed peak, about  high, in the Desko Mountains, rising  west-northwest of Thuma Peak in southeast Rothschild Island, Antarctica.

References 

Mountains of Palmer Land